ANGPTL8 (also known as lipasin, previously betatrophin) is a protein that in humans is encoded by the C19orf80 gene.

Gene 
The ANGPTL8 gene lies on mouse chromosome 9 (gene symbol: Gm6484) and on human chromosome 19 (gene symbol: C19orf80).

Discovery
The ANGPTL8 gene was discovered in 2012 as RIFL, Lipasin, and ANGPTL8.
 In 2013 it was suggested by Melton and Yi from Harvard that ANGPTL8 promotes mouse pancreatic islet cell proliferation. These results led the authors to propose an alternative name for ANGPTL8, betatrophin. However, the link between ANGPTL8 and islet proliferation was quickly proven false by other researchers. In fact, in December 2016 the original paper by Melton and Yi was retracted, putting the link between ANGPTL8 and islets cells to rest. Nevertheless, the name betatrophin continues to be used. Given the homology of ANGPTL8 with ANGPTL4 and ANGPTL3, and considering that ANGPTL8 does not promote beta cell proliferation, the name betatrophin should be abandoned in favor of ANGPTL8.

Function 
The encoded 22 kDa protein contains an N-terminal secretion signal and two coiled-coil domains and is a member of the angiopoietin-like (ANGPTL) protein family. However, in contrast to other ANGPTL proteins, ANGPTL8 lacks the C-terminal fibrinogen-like domain, and therefore it is an atypical member of the ANGPTL family. It shares with ANGPTL4 and ANGPTL8 the ability to inhibit the enzyme Lipoprotein lipase (LPL), and its hepatic overexpression causes elevation of circulating Triglyceride levels in mice. In mice ANGPTL8 is secreted by the liver and by adipose tissue.

Despite having elevated post-heparin plasma LPL activity, mice lacking ANGPTL8 exhibit markedly decreased uptake of Very low-density lipoprotein-derived fatty acids into white adipose tissue (WAT). The defect in fatty acids uptake by WAT in ANGPTL8-null mice is likely due to the enhanced fatty acid uptake by the heart and skeletal muscle, because of the elevated LPL activity in these two tissues, as suggested by the ANGPTL3-4-8 model.

ANGPTL8 was proposed to increase the rate at which beta-cells undergo cell division. Injection of mice with ANGPTL8 cDNA lowered blood sugar (i.e. hypoglycemia), presumably due to action at the pancreas. However, treatment of human islets with ANGPTL8 is unable to increase beta-cell division. Furthermore, studies in ANGPTL8 knock-out mice do not support a role of ANGPTL8 in controlling beta cell growth, yet point to a clear role in regulating plasma triglyceride levels. Based on these studies, it is fairly safe to say that the notion that ANGPTL8 promotes beta cell expansion is dead, which was made official by the retraction of the original paper. Deletion of ANGPTL8 does not seem to impact glucose and insulin tolerance in mice.

Structure 
Three dimensional structure of none of the members of Angiopoietin like proteins (ANGPTLs) is available up until now. However, the structure of ANGPTL8 was predicted by homology modeling and is also reported in literature. It consists of alpha helices and its sequence show high similarity with the coiled-coil domains of ANGPTL3 and ANGPTL4.

Pathway 
The ANGPTL8 regulatory pathway has been constructed recently by integrating the information of its know transcription factors which is available at WikiPathways data repository with the pathway id WP3915.

Clinical significance 
It was hoped that ANGPTL8 or its homolog in humans may provide an effective treatment for type 2 diabetes and perhaps even type I diabetes. Unfortunately, since new data have greatly called into question the ability of ANGPTL8 to increase beta-cell replication, its potential use as a therapy for type 2 diabetes is limited. Inhibition of ANGPTL8 represents a possible therapeutic strategy for hypertriglyceridemia.

References

External links
 

Hormones of the liver
Hormones of adipose tissue
Peptide hormones
Genes on human chromosome 19